Marinus van Reymerswaele or Marinus van Reymerswale  (c. 1490 – c. 1546) was a Dutch Renaissance painter mainly known for his genre scenes and religious compositions. After studying in Leuven and training and working as an artist in Antwerp, he returned later to work in his native Northern Netherlands.  He operated a large workshop which produced many versions of mainly four themes: the tax collectors, the money changer and his wife, the calling of Saint Matthew and St. Jerome in his study.

Biography

Marinus van Reymerswaele was born in the city of Reimerswaal and he also derives his last name from this city.  He was registered in February 1504 as a student at the University of Leuven.  He was registered in 1509 in the Liggeren of the Antwerp Guild of Saint Luke as a pupil of Symon van Daele, a glass painter.

He worked, at least from 1531 to 1540. In the latter year he moved to Goes, where he died around 1546.

Work
The artist is known for a small number of signed panels. A number of other paintings are attributed to Marinus on stylistic grounds. His works show the influence of the Antwerp painter Quentin Matsys.

His oeuvre deals with of a relatively small numbers of themes, mostly adapted from Quentin Massys and Albrecht Dürer:
The moneychanger and his wife
Two tax collectors
The lawyer’s office
Saint Jerome in his study
The calling of Matthew

A large group of paintings of tax collectors are wrongly attributed to Marinus.  His themes were popular in the sixteenth century and his paintings copied many times.

Madrid, the spanish capital concentrates the largest compendium of works by Marinus: the Prado Museum preserves four, the Thyssen-Bornemisza Museum, the Real Academia de Bellas Artes de San Fernando and the Monasterio de El Escorial (a permanent loan from the Prado) each own a piece. The Prado will open the first Marinus exhibition in 2021 .

List of works
Antwerp, The Phoebus Foundation 
 Two tax collectors
Antwerp, Royal Museum of Fine Arts
 Saint Jerome in his study (1541)
 Two tax collectors
Douai, Musee de la Chartreuse
 Saint Jerome in his study
Dresden, Gemäldegalerie Alte Meister
 The moneychanger and his wife (1541)
Florence, Bargello
 The moneychanger and his wife (1540)
Ghent, Museum voor Schone Kunsten
 The Calling of Matthew
Kopenhagen, Statens Museum for Kunst
 The moneychanger and his wife (1540)
London, National Gallery
Two tax collectors (ca. 1540) attributed to the workshop by the Museum.
Maastricht, Bonnefanten Museum
 Saint Jerome in his study (ca. 1541)
Madrid, Museo del Prado 
 Saint Jerome (1521)
The Virgin nursing the Child (1525-50)
 The moneychanger and his wife (1538) displayed permanently at the Royal Monastery of El Escorial 
 The moneychanger and his wife (1539)
 Saint Jerome in his study (1541)
Madrid, Real Academia de Bellas Artes de San Fernando
 St. Jerome in his cell (1535)
Madrid, Museo Thyssen-Bornemisza
 The Calling of St. Matthew (ca. 1530)
München, Alte Pinakothek
 The lawyer’s office (1542)
 The moneychanger and his wife (1538)
Naples, Palazzo Reale di Capodimonte
"Two tax collectors"
New Orleans, New Orleans Museum of Art
 The lawyer’s office (1543)
Paris, Louvre
 Two tax collectors (ca. 1540)
Saint Petersburg, Hermitage
 Two tax collectors
Vienna, Kunsthistorisches Museum
 Saint Jerome in his study
 The Unjust Steward
Private collections
 The Calling of Saint Matthew 
 The Calling of Saint Matthew

Gallery

Notes

References

External links

1490s births
1540s deaths
Dutch Renaissance painters
People from Reimerswaal
Old University of Leuven alumni
Dutch Mannerist painters